ECHA is the European Chemicals Agency, an agency of the European Union.

ECHA may also refer to:

 European Council for High Ability, an NGO of the Council of Europe concerned with giftedness
 Eastern Canada Hockey Association, formerly known as the Eastern Canada Amateur Hockey Association (ECAHA)
 Eastern Collegiate Hockey Association, US
 HADHA, an enzyme
 Edmonton Clinic Health Academy, a building at the University of Alberta